The Subcarpathian Voivodeship Sejmik is the regional legislature of the Voivodeship of Subcarpathia in Poland. It is a unicameral parliamentary body consisting of thirty-three councillors elected every five-years. The current chairperson of the assembly is Jerzy Borcz of the PiS.

The assembly elects the executive board that acts as the collective executive for the regional government, headed by the voivodeship marshal. The current Executive Board of Subcarpathia is held by the Law and Justice with Władysław Ortyl presiding as marshal.

The assembly meets in the Marshal's Office in Rzeszów.

Districts 
Members of the Subcarpathian Regional Assembly are elected from five districts and serve five-year terms. Districts do not have formal names. Instead, each constituency has a number and territorial description.

See also 
 Polish Regional Assembly
 Subcarpathian Voivodeship

References

External links 
 
 

Subcarpathian
Assembly
Unicameral legislatures